The Asia/Oceania Zone was one of three Zones of Davis Cup competition in 2002.

Group I

Lebanon relegated to Group II in 2003.
Thailand and India advance to World Group Play-off.

Group II

Kuwait and Malaysia relegated to Group III in 2003.
Pakistan promoted to Group I in 2003.

Group III

Participating Teams
  — promoted to Group II in 2003
 
 
  — relegated to Group IV in 2003
  — relegated to Group IV in 2003
 
  — promoted to Group II in 2003

Group IV

Participating Teams
  — promoted to Group III in 2003
 
 
 
 
  — promoted to Group III in 2003

References

See also

 
Asia Oceania
Davis Cup Asia/Oceania Zone